John J. Batbie Jr. (born October 16, 1946) was a major general in the United States Air Force who served as commander of the United States Air Force Reserve Command, Headquarters U.S. Air Force, Washington D.C., and commander, Headquarters Air Force Reserve, a separate operating agency located at Robins Air Force Base, Georgia. As chief of Air Force Reserve, he served as the principal adviser on Reserve matters to the Air Force Chief of Staff. As commander of AFRES, he had full responsibility for the supervision of U.S. Air Force Reserve units around the world. He served in this position from November 1994 to June 1998.

Batbie joined the U.S. Army in 1966 and served as an armor officer and helicopter pilot before joining the Air Force Reserve in 1972. He flew helicopters until 1979 when he graduated from the Air Force Fixed Wing Qualification Course at Sheppard Air Force Base, Texas. He was named outstanding graduate and received the Robert C. Swanson Memorial Award. In 1983, the general was the first Air Force Reserve officer to be assigned to Europe as a Reserve statutory tour officer. He coordinated Reserve affairs in both the plans and operations directorates, and served as negotiator for the establishment of collocated operating bases in Greece and Turkey.

Batbie has held numerous supervisory and command positions, including director of operations; commander of a squadron, group, wing and numbered air force; director of mobilization and reserve component affairs for U.S. European Command; and, for a limited time, commander of the Air Force Reserve Command.

His awards include the Distinguished Service Medal, Defense Superior Service Medal, Legion of Merit, Distinguished Flying Cross, Bronze Star Medal, Meritorious Service Medal with oak leaf cluster, Air Medal with four silver oak leaf clusters, and the Air Force Commendation Medal.

Education
1973 Bachelor of Arts degree in business administration, Arizona State University, Tempe 
1976 Air Command and Staff College, Maxwell AFB, Alabama 
1977 Industrial College of the Armed Forces, Fort Lesley J. McNair, Washington, D.C. 
1990 Master of Arts degree in business administration, Louisiana Tech University, Ruston

Assignments
 September 1967 – October 1968, training officer, I Corps, Camp Red Cloud, South Korea 
 October 1968 – December 1968, platoon leader, 3rd Armored Cavalry Regiment, Fort Lewis, Washington 
 January 1969 – October 1969, student, Army Basic Helicopter Course, Fort Wolters, Texas, Hunter Army Airfield, Ga., and Fort Rucker, Alabama 
 November 1969 – January 1970, student, AH-1G Cobra Course, Hunter Army Airfield, Georgia 
 February 1970 – February 1971, Cobra weapons platoon leader and operations officer, 101st Airborne Division, Quang Tri, South Vietnam 
 March 1971 – February 1972, staff officer, 101st Airborne Division, Fort Campbell, Kentucky 
 October 1972 – January 1979, HH-34J and CH-3E helicopter instructor pilot, 302nd Air Rescue and Recovery Squadron, Air Force Reserve, Luke AFB, Arizona 
 January 1979 – August 1979, student, fixed wing course, Sheppard AFB, Texas 
 August 1979 – October 1983, A-37 and A-10 pilot, group training officer, instructor pilot and executive officer, 917th Tactical Fighter Group, Barksdale AFB, Louisiana 
 November 1983 – January 1986, staff officer, Headquarters U.S. Air Forces in Europe, Ramstein Air Base, West Germany 
 January 1986 – August 1987, assistant director of operations, 452nd Air Refueling Wing, March AFB, California 
 August 1987 – April 1988, commander of 79th Air Refueling Squadron, March AFB, California 
 April 1988 – July 1991, commander of 916th Air Refueling Group, Seymour Johnson AFB, North Carolina 
 July 1991 – June 1994, commander of 434th Air Refueling Wing, Grissom AFB, Indiana 
 June 1994 – September 1998, director of plans and programs, Air Force Reserve Command, Robins AFB, Georgia 
 September 1998 – May 2000, commander of 22nd Air Force, Dobbins Air Reserve Base, Georgia 
 May 2000 – November 2001, director for mobilization and reserve component affairs, U.S. European Command, Stuttgart, Germany 
 November 2001 – 2005, vice commander of Air Force Reserve Command, Robins AFB, Georgia (June 1, 2004 – June 23, 2004, Commander, Air Force Reserve Command, Robins AFB, Georgia)

John Batbie, Jr. is married to Patriccia Batbie. They have three children together: Cristie Batbie Street, Cathie Batbie Loucks and Brittany Fugate, as well as numerous grandchildren. Including Em Loucks, Ethan Loucks, Skye Fugate, Ian Fugate, Liam Street, Scarlett Street

References

1946 births
Living people
W. P. Carey School of Business alumni
United States Army aviators
United States Army personnel of the Vietnam War
Louisiana Tech University alumni
United States Air Force generals
United States Air Force Reserves